Angelo Muscat (24 September 1930 – 10 October 1977) was a Maltese-born British character actor. He is primarily recalled for his role as the silent butler in the 1967 television series The Prisoner.

Biography 
Muscat was born on 24 September 1930 in Malta to a policeman father. Muscat initially found work as a kitchen porter and then as a stoker at an RAF base in Malta. After the death of his parents and finding himself largely alone, he moved to England where he worked in a zip-fastener factory. In 1961 Muscat joined a production of Snow White and the Seven Dwarfs that was to tour the United Kingdom. Moving into television, he played a Chumbley robot in the Doctor Who serial Galaxy 4 (1965), played the part of a clown in the ITV series Emergency – Ward 10 and appeared as the Queen's Servant in the BBC television adaptation of Alice in Wonderland (1966).

Muscat appeared in the television series The Prisoner (1967–1968) with Patrick McGoohan, appearing in 14 of the 17 episodes as the silent butler. He played an Oompa-Loompa in Willy Wonka & the Chocolate Factory (uncredited, 1971). He also appeared in the Beatles' Magical Mystery Tour (uncredited, 1967).

During his later years, Muscat lived alone and virtually penniless in a basement flat in North London. He found it difficult to find acting work, and to supplement his income he made ornate birdcages by hand.

Death 
Muscat died of pneumonia on 10 October 1977, aged 47 at St Bartholomew's Hospital in London.

Legacy 
Each year, on 10 October a small group of enthusiasts dubbed the "Friends of Angelo Muscat" (FOAM) celebrate his life.

TV and filmography

References

External links

Angelo Muscat on the 'Who's Who of Short People' website

1930 births
1977 deaths
20th-century male actors
Actors with dwarfism
Maltese expatriates in England
Maltese male film actors
Maltese male television actors